Romualdas Vinojinidis is a Soviet sprint canoer who competed in the early 1970s. He won a silver medal at the 1973 ICF Canoe Sprint World Championships in Tampere, Finland in the C-1 1000 m event.

References

Living people
Lithuanian male canoeists
Soviet male canoeists
Year of birth missing (living people)
Russian male canoeists
ICF Canoe Sprint World Championships medalists in Canadian